Agladrillia torquata is a species of sea snail, a marine gastropod mollusc in the family Drilliidae.

Description
The length of the shell varies between 7 mm and 22 mm.

Distribution
This species occurs in the Caribbean Sea off the coast of Colombia and French Guiana.

References

 Fallon P.J. (2016). Taxonomic review of tropical western Atlantic shallow water Drilliidae (Mollusca: Gastropoda: Conoidea) including descriptions of 100 new species. Zootaxa. 4090(1): 1–363

External links
 

torquata
Gastropods described in 2016